Halticotoma nicholi is a species of plant bug in the family Miridae. It is found in North America.

Subspecies
These two subspecies belong to the species Halticotoma nicholi:
 Halticotoma nicholi fulvicollis Knight, 1928
 Halticotoma nicholi nicholi Knight, 1928

References

Further reading

 

Articles created by Qbugbot
Insects described in 1928
Eccritotarsini